The Beehive House was one of the official residences of Brigham Young, the second president of the Church of Jesus Christ of Latter-day Saints, in Salt Lake City, Utah, United States. The Beehive House gets its name from the beehive sculpture atop the house.

Executive mansion of Brigham Young
The Beehive House was constructed in 1854, two years before the neighboring Lion House was built (also a residence of Young's). Both homes are one block east of the Salt Lake Temple and Temple Square on South Temple street in Salt Lake City, Utah. The home was designed by Young's brother-in-law and architect of the Salt Lake Temple, Truman O. Angell, who also designed the Lion House. It was constructed of adobe and sandstone.

Young was a polygamist, and the Beehive House was designed to accommodate his large family. The Beehive House also became his official residence as governor of Utah Territory and president of the LDS Church. Upon its completion, Young briefly shared the Beehive House with his senior (and only legally recognized) wife Mary Ann Angell (1803–1882), though she chose to make her home in the White House, a smaller residence on the property. Young's first polygamous wife, Lucy Ann Decker Young (1822–1890), possibly due to her seniority, became hostess of the Beehive House and lived there with her nine children.

The Beehive House served as the executive mansion of Utah Territory from 1852 to 1855 and was where Young entertained guests. The home is connected by a suite of rooms to the Lion House. This suite included Young's offices and his private bedroom where he died in 1877.

Private uses after Young's death
After Young's death, there was much dispute and some litigation by Young's heirs as to what was Young's property and what was the church's property. The Beehive House was among the properties in contention; although title was ultimately given to Young's heirs. The Beehive House was replaced as the executive mansion by the much grander Gardo House, at which time it was briefly occupied by Young's religious successors John Taylor and Wilford Woodruff.

Beginning in the late 1880s, Young's son, John W. Young, added a large Victorian style addition to the rear of the building, and heavily remodeled the older portion of the home. The Young family lost the home when it was sold at auction in 1893 to satisfy debts held by John W. Young.

John Beck, a successful miner and businessman, lived in the home for a short time before it was also sold to satisfy his creditors. Eventually it was purchased by the Church, and was used as the official home of church presidents Lorenzo Snow and his successor Joseph F. Smith, both of whom died in the mansion. Smith, who died in 1918, was the last church president to practice polygamy at the time of his death and shared the residence with four of his wives.

Subsequent history

Boarding house
In 1920, the Young Women Mutual Improvement Association of the LDS Church opened the Beehive House as a boarding home for single women working in Salt Lake City, many of whom were working as secretaries at the adjacent buildings of the LDS Church's headquarters complex. It continued to operate as a boarding house until the 1950s.

Restoration
The building was restored in 1959–60 under the direction of Georgius Y. Cannon, a grandson to Brigham Young. It is now a historic house museum with period furnishings (many original to the house) to depict the Young family's life in the mid-19th century. Daily tours are given by Church missionaries free of charge.

Temporary closure
In 2020, the Beehive House and other historic sites on Temple Square were closed to the public due to the COVID-19 pandemic in the United States.

References

External links
 
Beehive House official website
 

Houses completed in 1854
Brigham Young
Properties of religious function on the National Register of Historic Places in Utah
Historic house museums in Utah
Houses on the National Register of Historic Places in Utah
Museums in Salt Lake City
National Historic Landmarks in Utah
Properties of the Church of Jesus Christ of Latter-day Saints
Religious museums in Utah
The Church of Jesus Christ of Latter-day Saints in Utah
Houses in Salt Lake City
Historic American Buildings Survey in Utah
Mormon museums in the United States
1854 establishments in Utah Territory
Official residences in the United States
National Register of Historic Places in Salt Lake City
Individually listed contributing properties to historic districts on the National Register in Utah